Stay Afraid is the second full-length album from Parts & Labor, released in 2006 on Jagjaguwar Records.

Track listing
"A Great Divide"
"Drastic Measures"
"A Pleasant Stay"
"New Buildings"
"Death"
"Timeline"
"Repair"
"Stay Afraid"
"Springtime Hibernation"
"Changing of the Guard"

Reception

Pitchfork Media (7.7/10) 12 April 2006

2006 albums
Parts & Labor albums